Trinity A.M.E. Church is a historic African Methodist Episcopal Church building at 239 E. 600 South in Salt Lake City, Utah.

The Trinity A.M.E. Church was Utah's first black congregation, started in the 1880s. After years of meeting in homes and rented buildings, and one unsuccessful attempt to build a church, the congregation was able to buy this property in 1907 with money donated by Mary Bright, a cook who had made her fortune in Leadville, Colorado. The building was built in 1909 and added to the National Register of Historic Places in 1976.

References

African-American history of Utah
Gothic Revival church buildings in Utah
Methodist churches in Utah
Churches on the National Register of Historic Places in Utah
Churches completed in 1909
Churches in Salt Lake City
National Register of Historic Places in Salt Lake City